Die Torpiraten is a German television series.

See also
List of German television series

External links
 

2008 German television series debuts
2008 German television series endings
German children's television series
German sports television series
Television shows set in Cologne
German-language television shows